Westcote is a historic house in Cranston, Rhode Island.  This -story Greek Revival cottage was built c. 1843, and was originally located on Oaklawn Avenue before being moved to its present location.  It was built by a member of the locally prominent Westcott family as a farmhouse, and is a well-preserved and little-altered example of vernacular Greek Revival style.

The house was listed on the National Register of Historic Places in 1988.

See also
National Register of Historic Places listings in Providence County, Rhode Island

References

Houses on the National Register of Historic Places in Rhode Island
Houses in Cranston, Rhode Island
National Register of Historic Places in Providence County, Rhode Island